Obrat is a settlement in the Municipality of Benedikt in northeastern Slovenia. It lies in the Slovene Hills in the valley of Drvanja Creek. The area is part of the traditional region of Styria. It is now included in the Drava Statistical Region.

Traces of Roman-period buildings and a burial ground with burial mounds have been identified near the settlement.

References

External links
Obrat at Geopedia

Populated places in the Municipality of Benedikt